Dr. Jürgen F. Strube (b. 1939-08-19) is the former CEO and the current Chairman of the Supervisory Board of German chemical company BASF SE.

Biography
Strube was born in Bochum, Germany, in 1939. He studied law from 1960 to 1964 in Freiburg, Geneva and Munich, obtained his doctorate in law in Munich in 1967, and passed the 2nd state examination in law in 1968.  He began his professional career at BASF in 1969 in Germany, where he joined the Finance Department at Ludwigshafen. During his career he worked in several divisions in Antwerp, São Paulo, New Jersey and Germany. Since May 2003, he has been chairman of the Supervisory Board of BASF. He is married with one daughter.

External links 
BASF press information

1939 births
Living people
Businesspeople from North Rhine-Westphalia
European Union lobbyists
BASF people
People from Bochum